Belimel is a village in northwestern Bulgaria, part of Chiprovtsi Municipality, Montana Province.

Belimel Bay in Trinity Island, Antarctica is named after Belimel.

Notes

Villages in Montana Province
Chiprovtsi Municipality